Joe Dooley was an Irish former hurler who played as a right corner-back for the Offaly senior team.

Born in Banagher, County Offaly, Dooley first played competitive hurling in his youth. 
He was described as being "a teak tough defender, who played most of his hurling in the full back line".

He made his senior debut with Offaly during the 1966-67 National League and immediately became a regular member of the team. During his brief career he experienced little success.

At club level Dooley is a one-time Leinster medallist with St Rynagh's. He won 12 Offaly senior hurling championship medals, between 1965 and 1982.  He also won three Leinster Club Championship medals with St Rynagh’s in 1970, 72 and 1982.

Despite being domiciled in Dublin, for a long number of years, he maintained a keen interest in the fortunes of Offaly GAA and was a regular attendee at club and county games.

Death
Dooley died on 28 June 2014.

Honours
St Rynagh's
Leinster Senior Club Hurling Championship (2): 1972, 1982

References

St Rynagh's hurlers
Offaly inter-county hurlers
2014 deaths
Year of birth missing